Arthur Buttery (20 December 1908 – 1990) was an English professional footballer who played as an inside left. He scored 61 goals from 167 appearances in the Football League.

Career
Born in Hednesford, Buttery played for St. Peter's Church, Hednesford Town, Wolverhampton Wanderers, Bury, Bradford City, Walsall, Bristol Rovers and Stafford Rangers. He joined Bradford City in January 1937, and left the club  in June 1938. For them he made 35 appearances in the Football League, scoring 13 goals.

Sources

References

1908 births
1990 deaths
English footballers
Hednesford Town F.C. players
Wolverhampton Wanderers F.C. players
Bury F.C. players
Bradford City A.F.C. players
Walsall F.C. players
Bristol Rovers F.C. players
Stafford Rangers F.C. players
English Football League players
Association football inside forwards
Date of death missing
Place of death missing
People from Hednesford